Eszter is a female Hungarian  given name of Hebrew origin (from Esther) and may refer to:

Eszter Balint (born 1966), singer, violinist, and actress
Eszter Csákányi (born 1953), Hungarian actress
Eszter Hargittai (born 1973), communication scholar at the University of Zurich
Eszter Hollosi, Budapest-born actress and director
Eszter Krutzler (born 1981), female weightlifter from Hungary
Eszter Mátéfi (born 1966), Hungarian handball player who competed in the 1996 Summer Olympics
Eszter Mattioni (1902–1993), prominent twentieth century Hungarian painter
Eszter Rasztótsky, Hungarian sprint canoeist who has competed in the early 2000s
Eszter Tamási (1938–1991), Hungarian TV announcer and actress

Hungarian feminine given names